is a former Japanese football player. She played for Japan national team.

Club career
Fushimi played for L.League club Suzuyo Shimizu FC Lovely Ladies.

National team career
On August 21, 1994, Fushimi debuted for Japan national team against Austria.

National team statistics

References

Year of birth missing (living people)
Living people
Japanese women's footballers
Japan women's international footballers
Nadeshiko League players
Suzuyo Shimizu FC Lovely Ladies players
Women's association football defenders